Great Books is an hour-long documentary and biography program that aired on The Learning Channel. The series was a project co-created by Walter Cronkite and former child actor Jonathan Ward under a deal they had with their company Cronkite-Ward, The Discovery Channel, and The Learning Channel. Premiering on September 8, 1993, to coincide with International Literacy Day, the series took in-depth looks at some of literature's greatest fiction and nonfiction books, along with the authors who created them. Most of the narration was provided by Donald Sutherland.

Episodes feature insights from historians, scholars, novelists, artists, writers, and filmmakers who were directly influenced by the books showcased and discussed.


List of episodes

Spin-off 

Grandes Livros premiered in 2009 and was a multi-platform release of Portuguese literature that involves a series of 12 documentaries. Each episode was a biography and documentary at 50-minutes each, narrated by Diogo Infante, actor and director of the Teatro Nacional D. Maria II. The featured episodes include:

 1. Os Maias (Eça de Queirós)
 2. Os Lusíadas (Luís Vaz de Camões)
 3. O Delfim (José Cardoso Pires)
 4. Amor De Perdição (Camilo Castelo Branco)
 5. Viagens na Minha Terra (Almeida Garrett)
 6. Sermão de Santo António Aos Peixes
 7. Aparição (Vergílio Ferreira)
 8. Livro do Desassossego (Fernando Pessoa)
 9. Mau Tempo No Canal (Vitorino Nemésio)
 10. Peregrinação (Fernão Mendes Pinto)
 11. Sinais De Fogo (Jorge de Sena)
 12. Navegações (Sophia de Mello Breyner Andresen)

References

External links 
 
 Greater Books

Television shows about books and literature
1993 American television series debuts
1990s American documentary television series
2000s American documentary television series
2002 American television series endings
English-language television shows
TLC (TV network) original programming